International Business College is a for-profit college in Indianapolis, Indiana.   It was founded in 1889 and moved to its current suburban location in 1985.  It has adjacent housing for students but over half of students come from the Indianapolis area. IBC awards diplomas and associate degrees.

Student body, admissions, and outcomes 
According to Peterson's  and recent institutional publications, International Business College has an undergraduate population of 403.   Of 1,012 applicants, 707 (or 70%) were admitted. Per College Navigator, the most recent graduation/transfer out rate is 76%.

Accreditation 

International Business College is accredited by the Accrediting Commission of Career Schools and Colleges  to award diplomas and associate degrees
The Medical Assistant Program is accredited by the Commission on Accreditation of Allied Health Education Programs
The Veterinary Technology program is accredited by the American Veterinary Medical Association (AVMA) Committee on Veterinary Technician Education and Activities (CVTEA)
The Dental Assisting program is accredited by the Commission on Dental Accreditation  of the American Dental Association.

External links
Official website

Graphic design schools in the United States
For-profit universities and colleges in the United States
Universities and colleges in Indianapolis
1889 establishments in Indiana
Private universities and colleges in Indiana